Hennigar is a surname. Notable people with the surname include:

Karen Hennigar (born 1953), Canadian curler
Rob Hennigar (born 1983), Canadian ice hockey player and coach

See also
14164 Hennigar, main-belt asteroid
Hennigan